The American rock band Breaking Benjamin has released six studio albums, two compilation albums, three extended plays, 23 singles and 17 music videos. The group has sold over nineteen million units in the United States alone, with three platinum records, two gold records, three multi-platinum singles, three platinum singles, and six gold singles as designated by the RIAA. The band signed with Hollywood Records in 2002 following the success of their independently released eponymous EP, and began recording their first full-length major-label debut Saturate shortly thereafter. The record peaked at number two on the US Top Heatseekers chart and number 136 on the US Billboard 200. It was eventually certified gold in 2015. The band's sophomore effort, We Are Not Alone, released in 2004, peaked at number 20 on the US Billboard 200, and was later certified platinum in the United States and gold in New Zealand. Breaking Benjamin's third studio album Phobia was released in 2006 and reached number two on the US Billboard 200, number one on the US Digital Albums chart, number one on the US Top Rock Albums chart, and was later certified platinum in the United States and silver in the United Kingdom. Breaking Benjamin released their fourth record in late 2009 titled Dear Agony, reaching number one on the US Top Hard Rock Albums and US Top Alternative Albums charts, number two on the US Top Rock Albums and US Digital Albums charts, and number four on the US Billboard 200. The record was certified gold three months after its release and was later certified platinum.

Near the end of a tour supporting Dear Agony, front man Benjamin Burnley announced that he was ill and thereby no longer able to tour, placing the band on indefinite hiatus. During this time, guitarist Aaron Fink and bassist Mark Klepaski unilaterally permitted the compilation, recording, and release of Shallow Bay: The Best of Breaking Benjamin and a remix of the song "Blow Me Away" featuring Sydnee Duran of Valora. Burnley, asserting that the two had acted without consulting him, fired Fink and Klepaski. Shortly after the legal matters were settled in 2013, drummer Chad Szeliga announced his departure due to "creative differences". Shallow Bay was released in 2011, despite Burnley publicly opposing it, who said content had been altered without his consent and did not meet his standards. It went on to top the US Top Hard Rock Albums chart in three consecutive years, from 2011 to 2013.

In 2014, Burnley announced the band's reformation with a completely new lineup. Later in early 2015, the band announced a fifth full-length studio album titled Dark Before Dawn which was released in the summer of 2015, and debuted atop the US Billboard 200, the first to reach number one on that chart and was later certified gold in the United States. The band later released both the studio album Ember (2018) and their second compilation album Aurora (2020).

Albums

Studio albums

Compilation albums

Extended plays

Singles

As featured artist

Notes

Other charted and certified songs

Notes

Music videos

References

Discography
Rock music group discographies
Discographies of American artists